St. Clair Township is one of the eighteen townships of Columbiana County, Ohio, United States. As of the 2010 census the population was 7,957.

Geography
Located in the southeastern part of the county, it borders the following townships and borough:
 Middleton Township - north
 Ohioville, Pennsylvania - east
 Liverpool Township - south
 Madison Township - west
 Elkrun Township - northwest corner

Two CDPs and one unincorporated community are located in St. Clair Township:
 The census-designated place of Calcutta, in the center
 The census-designated place of Glenmoor, in the southwest
 The unincorporated community of Fredericktown, in the northeast

Name and history

Statewide, the only other St. Clair Township is located in Butler County.

The township was among the first organized in the county in 1803.

Government
The township is governed by a three-member board of trustees, who are elected in November of odd-numbered years to a four-year term beginning on the following January 1. Two are elected in the year after the presidential election and one is elected in the year before it. There is also an elected township fiscal officer, who serves a four-year term beginning on April 1 of the year after the election, which is held in November of the year before the presidential election. Vacancies in the fiscal officership or on the board of trustees are filled by the remaining trustees.

Township Trustees
James Sabatini II, Chairman
Robert Swickard, Vice Chairman
Jordan G. Williams

Fiscal Officer
Deborah Dawson

References

External links
 County website

Townships in Columbiana County, Ohio
Townships in Ohio
Populated places established in 1803
1803 establishments in Ohio